Lycée Français Louis Pasteur de Lagos is a French international school in Victoria Island, Lagos, Nigeria. The school has primaire and secondaire levels.

History
The French School of Lagos was founded in 1958 by the Association Française du Nigeria (AFN). Before the current school was built in 1987 with the help of the French Ministry of Foreign Affairs, it moved to several places in Ikoyi and in Victoria Island. AFN is a non-profit organisation, an incorporated trustees association which is the corporate body of this private school. Parents are members of the association and elect parents amongst them to form the management committee.

Through an agreement signed in 2002 with the Agency for French Education Abroad (AEFE), an agency of the French Ministry of the Foreign Affairs, the school is linked with French authorities which give it financial support. In accordance with that agreement, the school delivers French grades and diplomas giving access to post graduation studies at French universities and in other European countries' universities as well as Quebec, Canada. (The Lycee Francais of Lagos is one of the 494 school establishments depending on the AEFE in the world.)

In 1997, the French School became officially the "Lycee Français". Extensions of the current building were done in 1998 and in 2004.

Facilities
The Lycée Français Louis Pasteur is composed of three buildings, two yards, and three sports areas.

One main building has the classrooms, the laboratories, the CDI and the BCD (school libraries), the administration, the meeting rooms.

One building has the "Salle des Droits de l’Homme" which is a hall used for all the representations (theatre, shows, big meetings, etc.) and for some sport competitions or training (gymnastic, karate, fencing, etc.). Its capacity is around 200 seats. Next door, there is the new canteen, where students and teachers can buy food or snacks.

One building holds specific classrooms for mathematics and language teaching, and the office of the CPE and the "Vie Scolaire" which manage the Secondary School.

There is an indoor sport field mainly used for basketball, handball, and volleyball. The  outdoor grass field is ideal for football or running. In 2017 a swimming pool was  built.

See also

 Institut français du Nigeria in Abuja

References

External links
 Lycée Français Louis Pasteur website

French international schools in Nigeria
International schools in Lagos
Secondary schools in Lagos State
Educational institutions established in 1958
1958 establishments in Nigeria